Granodomus lima is a species of air-breathing land snail, a terrestrial pulmonate gastropod mollusk in the family Sagdidae.

Distribution 
This species occurs in Puerto Rico.

References

External links
 Férussac, A.E.J.P.F. d'Audebard de. (1819-1832). Histoire naturelle générale et particulière des mollusques terrestres et fluviatiles tant des espèces que l'on trouve aujourd'hui vivantes, que des dépouilles fossiles de celles qui n'existent plus; classés d'après les caractères essentiels que présentent ces animaux et leurs coquilles. J.-B. Bailliere, Paris. Tome deuxième, première partie
 Férussac, A.E.J.P.F. d'Audebard de. (1821-1822). Tableaux systématiques des animaux mollusques classés en familles naturelles, dans lesquels on a établi la concordance de tous les systèmes; suivis d'un Prodrome général pour tous les mollusques ou fluviatiles, vivantes ou fossiles. Paris, 1821 et 1822. 
 Sei M., Robinson D.G., Geneva A.J. & Rosenberg G. (2017). Doubled helix: Sagdoidea is the overlooked sister group of Helicoidea (Mollusca: Gastropoda: Pulmonata). Biological Journal of the Linnean Society. 122(4): 697-728

Sagdidae
Gastropods described in 1821